BEANPOLE established in 1989, is a South Korean fashion brand owned by SAMSUNG C&T Fashion group. It produces seven distinctive lines (BEANPOLE MEN, BEANPOLE LADIES and BEANPOLE KIDS); as well as accessories (BEANPOLE ACCESSORY), golf wear (BEANPOLE GOLF), and Sports fashion/equipment (BEANPOLE SPORTS). Towards the end of 2019 they added the ‘890311’ to their list of sub-brands.

Background 
In the past decade, BEANPOLE has gradually expanded internationally, with the majority of its shops located in Asia.  There are 476 shops worldwide especially in Korea (372), China(104) . In 2019, BEANPOLE has marked 30 years since its launch by undergoing a major renewal. The label’s new identity features Korean retro and street-inspired apparel as well as other classic looks. Marking its 30th anniversary,  this rebranding means being reborn as a sustainable brand with a new image encompassing products, stores, and visuals.

Logo 

Since its establishment, BEANPOLE has continuously adjusted its logo, making minor changes. Some of the most obvious changes can be found in the company’s new logos in 2019. BEANPOLE has made a new Hangeul logo using its brand identity and distinctive design.

Partnerships and Collaborations 
In 2010 BEANPOLE paired with IDEO, an international design firm, to expand the borders of BEANPOLE. The contribution of IDEO’s support, successfully helped BEANPOLE to infiltrate the foreign markets, as they now have over 400 stores across Asia and a number of sub-brands across the globe. BEANPOLE, has worked alongside: Carlos Osman (2009), Juun.J (2010), Band of Outsiders (2010), Kim Jones (2011), Fashion blogger The satorialist (2011),  and Christophe Lemaire (2012); and has partnered with Liberty London / Opening Ceremony, which contributed to their global expansion in the fashion industry.  BEANPOLE also officially supported Olympic uniforms for Korean representatives in both London(2012) and Rio(2016). For sustainable and eco-friendly commitment, 'The Bike We Like' campaign has been conducted since 2018, upcycling abandoned bikes and donating communities in need.

See also 
Contemporary culture of South Korea
Foreign celebrity advertising

References 

Clothing companies of South Korea